The Victoria Shamrocks are a Senior A box lacrosse team, based in Victoria, British Columbia.  The team competes in the 7-team Western Lacrosse Association (WLA).

The Shamrocks entered the former Inter-City Lacrosse League, which is now the WLA, in 1950.  The team became known as the Victoria Pay Less in 1982 to reflect a major sponsorship by Pay Less Gas.  The team readopted the Shamrocks name in 1995.

The Shamrocks have won the Mann Cup Canadian National Championship a total of 9 times; in 1955, 1957, 1979, 1983, 1997, 1999, 2003, 2005 and 2015. They have won a total of 21 Provincial Championships.

Some of the greatest lacrosse players in the world have been proud to wear the green and white, including Jack Bionda, Rick Brown, Archie Browning, Fred "Whitey" Severson, Geordie Johnston, "Bobby" Monaghan, Kevin Alexander, both Paul and Gary Gait, and John Tavares.  The Shamrocks home arena features a "Wall of Fame" where many great players, coaches, trainers and managers who have been part of the team are enshrined.

On September 16, 2005, the Victoria Shamrocks won their 8th Mann Cup, defeating the Peterborough Lakers 4 games to 2 in a classic, hard-fought series.  Shamrocks' goaltender Anthony Cosmo was awarded the Mike Kelley Memorial Trophy as the series Most Valuable Player.

Almost 10 years later, on September 11, 2015, the Victoria Shamrocks won their 9th Mann Cup, once again defeating the Peterborough Lakers 4 games to 2 in another hard-fought series. Shamrocks' forward Corey Small was awarded the Mike Kelley Memorial Trophy as the series Most Valuable Player.

 Current Roster

Current WLA Scores and Stats

All-time record

External links
 Victoria Shamrocks Official Website
 Kevin Light's Photos of Home Games
 Gary Woodburn's Photos of Home Games
 Western Lacrosse Association Website
 Victoria Junior "A" Shamrocks
 Victoria Intermediate "A" Shamrocks

Shamrocks
Western Lacrosse Association teams
Lacrosse clubs established in 1950
1950 establishments in British Columbia